"Le Frunkp" is a 2002 song performed by the fictional character Alphonse Brown (portrayed by Michaël Youn), the "unknown son" of James Brown, who tries to start his own career by creating a new (fictional) style called "Frunkp" (a mixture of funk and rap), in French film La Beuze, written by Youn and Desagnat. The music video shows images from film.

The song became a hit, topping the charts in all countries where it was released. As of August 2014, the song was the 16th best-selling single of the 21st century in France, with 573,000 units sold.

Track listings
 CD single
 "Le Frunkp" — 3:22
 "Le Frunkp" (instrumental) — 3:30

 12" maxi
 "Le Frunkp" — 3:22
 "Le Frunkp" (instrumental) — 3:30
 "Le Frunkp" (a cappella) — 3:22

Certifications

Charts

References

2002 songs
2003 singles
Michaël Youn songs
Ultratop 50 Singles (Wallonia) number-one singles
SNEP Top Singles number-one singles
Number-one singles in Switzerland
Songs written for films